The Charleston metropolitan area is an urban area centered around Charleston, South Carolina. The U.S. Office of Management and Budget designates the area as the Charleston–North Charleston, SC Metropolitan Statistical Area, a metropolitan statistical area used for statistical purposes only by the United States Census Bureau and other federal agencies. The OMB defines the area as comprising Berkeley, Charleston and Dorchester counties, an area with 799,636 residents in the 2020 census.  Principal cities include Charleston, North Charleston, and Summerville. The area is commonly referred to as the Tri-County Area or the Lowcountry, though the latter term has historically referred to South Carolina's southern coast in general.

Area

Counties

Largest cities and towns

Communities

Places with more than 100,000 inhabitants
Charleston (Principal city / County Seat)
North Charleston (Principal city)

Places with 25,000 to 100,000 inhabitants
Goose Creek
Mount Pleasant
Summerville

Places with 5,000 to 25,000 inhabitants
Hanahan
James Island
Johns Island
Ladson (census-designated place)
Moncks Corner (County Seat)
Hollywood
Sangaree (census-designated place)

Places with 1,000 to 5,000 inhabitants
Awendaw
Folly Beach
Isle of Palms
Kiawah Island
Lincolnville
Meggett
Ravenel
Ridgeville
Seabrook Island
St. George (County Seat)
St. Stephen
Sullivan's Island

Places with fewer than 1,000 inhabitants
Bonneau
Harleyville
Jamestown
McClellanville
Reevesville
Rockville

Unincorporated places
Cross
Gumville
Huger 
Pineville
Wadmalaw Island

Demographics

As of the census of 2000, there were 549,033 people, 227,957 households, and 161,448 families residing within the MSA. The racial makeup of the MSA was 65.10% White, 30.80% African American, 0.41% Native American, 1.32% Asian, 0.06% Pacific Islander, 0.98% from other races, and 1.34% from two or more races. Hispanic or Latino of any race were 2.38% of the population.

The median income for a household in the MSA was $40,345, and the median income for a family was $47,186. Males had a median income of $33,229 versus $24,118 for females. The per capita income for the MSA was $19,037.

Armed Forces
Portions of the Charleston, South Carolina metropolitan area (The City of Charleston, The City of North Charleston, The City of Goose Creek, and The City of Hanahan) are home to all branches of the United States Military. During the Cold War, the Naval Base (1902-1996) became the third largest U.S. homeport serving over 80 ships and submarines. In addition, the Charleston Naval Shipyard repaired frigates, destroyers, cruisers, sub tenders, and submarines. Also, the Shipyard was responsible for refueling nuclear subs.

During this period, the Weapons Station was the Atlantic Fleet's load out base for all nuclear ballistic missile submarines. Two SSBN "Boomer" squadrons and a sub tender were homeported at the Weapons Station, while one SSN attack squadron, Submarine Squadron 4, and a sub tender were homeported at the Naval Base. At the 1996 closure of the Station's Polaris Missile Facility Atlantic (POMFLANT), over 2,500 nuclear warheads and their UGM-27 Polaris, UGM-73 Poseidon, and UGM-96 Trident I delivery missiles (SLBM) were stored and maintained, guarded by a U.S. Marine Corps Security Force Company.

In 2010, the Air Force Base (3,877 acres) and Naval Weapons Station (>17,000 acres) merged to form Joint Base Charleston. Today, Joint Base Charleston, encompassing over 20,877 acres and supporting 53 Military Commands and Federal Agencies, provides service to over 79,000 Airmen, Sailors, Soldiers, Marines, Coast Guardsmen, DOD civilians, dependents, and retirees.

Navy 
Charleston Naval Weapons Station, Joint Base Charleston (>17,000 acres, 27 square miles), Goose Creek and Hanahan
Naval Information Warfare Center Atlantic (NAVWAR)
Naval Nuclear Power Training Command
Nuclear Power School
Nuclear Power Training Unit
Moored Training Nuclear Submarine, 
Moored Training Nuclear Submarine, 
Moored Training Nuclear Submarine, 2015 delivery
Moored Training Nuclear Submarine, After 2015 delivery
Naval Consolidated Brig, Charleston, East Coast
Mobile Mine Assembly Unit Eleven (MOMAU-11)
Naval Operations Support Center Charleston
Navy Reserve Center
Navy Munitions Command CONUS, Detachment Charleston
Explosive Ordnance Detachment
Naval Health Clinic Charleston
Navy Dental Clinic
Naval Criminal Investigative Service Training, Federal Complex
Lay berth for Roll-On Roll-Off Naval Ships, Military Sealift Command, Federal Complex
MV Cape Ducato (T-AKR-5051), Military Sealift Command Ship, Ready Reserve Force, Federal Complex
MV Cape Douglas (T-AKR-5052), Military Sealift Command Ship, Ready Reserve Force, Federal Complex
MV Cape Domingo (T-AKR-5053), Military Sealift Command Ship, Ready Reserve Force, Federal Complex
MV Cape Decision (T-AKR-5054), Military Sealift Command Ship, Ready Reserve Force, Federal Complex
MV Cape Diamond (T-AKR-5055), Military Sealift Command Ship, Ready Reserve Force, Federal Complex
MV Cape Edmont (T-AKR-5069),  Military Sealift Command Ship, Ready Reserve Force, Federal Complex

Air Force 
Charleston Air Force Base, Joint Base Charleston (3,877 acres, 6.06 square miles), North Charleston
Charleston Air Force Auxiliary Base, North, SC (2,393 acres, 3.74 square miles)
Charleston Defense Fuel Storage and Distribution Facility, Hanahan  
628th Air Base Wing
628th Mission Support Group
628th Medical Group
315th Airlift Wing
437th Airlift Wing
373rd Training Squadron, Detachment 5
1st Combat Camera Squadron
412th Logistics Support Squadron OL-AC 
Air Force ROTC Det 772
Civil Air Patrol – Charleston Composite Squadron

Marines 
Marine Corps Reserve Center, Naval Weapons Station

Coast Guard 
Coast Guard Sector Charleston (District 7)
Coast Guard Station Charleston
Coast Guard Base Charleston
Coast Guard Helicopter Air Facility, Johns Island
Coast Guard Eurocopter HH-65 Dolphin, Johns Island
Coast Guard Reserves, Charleston
Coast Guard Maritime Law Enforcement Academy, Federal Complex
 National Security Cutter, Federal Complex
 National Security Cutter, Federal Complex
USCGC Stone (WMSL-758 National security cutter, Federal Complex
USCGC Tarpon, Marine Protector-class coastal patrol boat, Tybee Island
USCGC Yellowfin, Marine Protector-class coastal patrol boat, Charleston
USCGC Anvil, Charleston

Army 
United States Army Corps of Engineers, Charleston District
South Carolina Army National Guard
Army Reserve Training Center, Naval Weapons Station
841st Army Transportation Battalion, Naval Weapons Station
1182nd Army Deployment & Distribution Support Battalion, Naval Weapons Station 
1189th Army Transportation Brigade, Reserve Support Command, Naval Weapons Station
Army Strategic Logistics Activity, Naval Weapons Station

Federal Complex (former Charleston Naval Base), North Charleston 
Federal Law Enforcement Training Centers (FLETC), Department of Homeland Security
Moored FLETC Training Ship, SS Cape Chalmers (T-AK-5036)
Sea Hawk Interagency Operations Center
Customs and Border Protection Satellite Academy
Immigration and Customs Enforcement Satellite Academy
U.S. Courts, Federal Probation and Pretrial Services Academy
Food and Drug Administration Training Academy
National Oceanic and Atmospheric Administration (NOAA)
NOAAS Nancy Foster (R 352) Ship
NOAAS Ronald H. Brown (R 104) Ship
U.S. Department of State
Global Financial Services Center, U.S. Department of State
L*Passport Service Center, U.S. Department of State
United States Maritime Administration

See also
South Carolina census statistical areas

External links
  *** [See section 5 for definition and proper use of Metropolitan Statistical Area]

References

 See section 5 for definition and proper use of Metropolitan Statistical Area

Charleston–North Charleston–Summerville metropolitan area
Geography of Berkeley County, South Carolina
Geography of Charleston County, South Carolina
Geography of Dorchester County, South Carolina